Mollacəfərli is a village in the municipality of Qarahəsənli in the Agstafa Rayon of Azerbaijan.

References

Populated places in Aghstafa District